Glaucodot is a cobalt iron arsenic sulfide mineral with formula . The cobalt:iron(II) ratio is typically 3:1 with minor nickel substituting. It forms a series with arsenopyrite . It is an opaque grey to tin-white typically found as massive forms without external crystal form. It crystallizes in the orthorhombic system. The locality at Håkansboda, Sweden has rare twinned dipyramidal crystals (see photo). It is brittle with a Mohs hardness of 5 and a specific gravity of 5.95. It occurs in high temperature hydrothermal deposits with pyrrhotite and chalcopyrite. Glaucodot is classed as a sulfide in the arsenopyrite löllingite group.

Glaucodot was first described in 1849 in Huasco, Valparaíso Province, Chile. Its name originates from the Greek  ("blue") in reference to its use in the dark blue glass called smalt.

References

 Webmineral:Glaucodot
 Mindat with location data
 Scandinavian mineral gallery 
 Hurlbut, Cornelius S.; Klein, Cornelis, 1985, Manual of Mineralogy, 20th ed., p. 288, 

Cobalt minerals
Iron minerals
Sulfosalt minerals
Arsenic minerals
Monoclinic minerals
Minerals in space group 14